Matthew "Matty" Levan is a fictional character from the third generation of the British teen drama Skins, portrayed by actor Sebastian de Souza. Matty is described as "mysterious and initially unrealistic character, because he's untouchable."

Matty is the only lead character in the history of Skins to never have a centric episode - either solo or shared. It follows that he's mainly known through relationships with some of the other characters.

Characterisation
Matty seems to appear in the fifth series out of nowhere, in a black trenchcoat and a duffle bag like a vagabond without a home. "As a character within the group, his position is initially very confusing. He has a definite charisma, with a very abstract philosophy on life, but he's just one of those characters that could go either way, and do very bad or very good things." Only after a half of the series his name is revealed, and he turns out to be Nick's older brother. Trapped in a life by a tyrannical father (Leon Levan), Matty had decided to rebel and leave home, engaged in criminal behaviour and drug abuse. His return will help Nick confront his dad and find the strength to pursue his own road.

In terms of his personality, Matty is a pensive, passional, and intuitive boy. He likes reading, composing music, and through his tastes it crops out a dark and slightly depressive side which stays hidden. "When the character was in development, he was explicitly bisexual, this element was left unsaid but he's still a bit of a nymph." In series 5, "Matty is like in the shallow end, having fun nibbling at people's feet." "What’s come away from him in series six is this veneer and the defence mechanisms he used to utilise, through a number of incredibly tragic and revelatory events." In order to cope with them Matty finally decides to cast aside all his wishes and embraces the only way to build his future.

Levan family
There is an underlying sadness in this family, an absent mother that Nick (Sean Teale), Leon (Dorian Lough) and Matty never mention, like a blank spot in their past that is influencing how they interact. Leon is a failure as a life coach (one of his patients commit suicide) and as a father, but there is also a hint that his failure to connect to his sons in any other way than as a tyrannical, emotionless coach might be rooted in whatever happened to his wife. Nick and Matty cope differently with the situation. Nick in the first part of series five has shaped himself in the image of his dad, embracing his ideology, following his rules. Matty in reverse is breaking all the rules and leaves home in order to find by himself the freedom he needs.

It's never been easy the relationship between the brothers. Matty represents the rebel part inside of Nick, what Matty's got looks to him realer because Nick is all compromise; on the other hand Nick's fake behaviour irritates Matty, who yearns that Nick can find his own route. Nonetheless there is a very strong connection between the brothers, just as Matty can't stay away from home forever and needs to come back, Nick misses his brother when he's out because Matty is the only person who understands him. Matty's return is crucial for Nick, who tempted cleverly by his brother realizes to be enslaved by Leon's expectations. Up against the choice between losing Matty again or disappointing his father, Nick in episode 5 decides to leave drastically his past and embraces change. "After Nick's change their relationship is much stronger. They are able to say things to each other that they never said before and they needed to say."

Matty and Franky
"Franky Fitzgerald (Dakota Blue Richards) is the only person in the group Matty doesn't fully understand." When Matty meets Franky, he's fascinated by her, and the same is true the other way round. Nobody's ever been so accepting with Franky as he is. She's never felt normal in her life and no-one's tried to make her feel normal, but what Matty's done is just to say: Actually you don't need to be normal because you're something even better."

In series 5, Franky gets chastised by people throughout the series for being "androgynous", but it's not an issue for them and that's how the connection arises between Franky and Matty. Unlike Franky, who likes him from the start because she craves feeling - Matty falls in love with her in a very slow process, began the day they met and put through the final scene. "The other people in Matty's life are like candles - they come in, bring light into his life but after a while they'll burn out and he'll get bored of them. But Franky is the light that won't go away."

Character history

Series 5
Matty first appears in "Franky", when he shows up out of nowhere running into Franky at a secluded part of the city. She's in tears after her meltdown at school, courtesy of Mini and Nick. Franky, who was in distress, immediately reacts with hostility towards him, drawing her gun on him and yelling at him to leave. Matty, however, simply approaches and challenges her to shoot him. He then tells her that she's beautiful just the way she is, which takes Franky completely by surprise, and leaves. This experience empowers Franky enough to persuade her to confront Mini.

In "Mini", Franky looks through the crowd at Roundview's fashion show after-party and briefly spots Matty. She shyly smiles at him but he soon walks off before she can approach him.

In "Liv", Matty appears and sits next to Liv outside a bus station. An unkempt man thrusts some drugs at them just as the police arrive and arrest him for possession. Matty reluctantly accepts Liv's offer to take the drugs (MDMA) and to spend the day together before leaving town. Firstly they steal from a gas station, then they go to a costume shop, where the shop owner sends Matty to try on a suit while he attempts to touch Liv in the dressing room. Matty knocks the molester out with a fire extinguisher, takes the cash from the till before they run away in bearsuits. Fearing for their crime, Liv asks Matty if she can leave with him the day after. They kiss and end up to have sex on a roof of a disco. The next day they return to Liv's house, where the gang is still partying. Liv and Matty burst into Liv's room to find Mini and Nick in her bed. They discover Nick and Matty are brothers and it is brought out into the open that Liv and Nick slept together. Although Matty doesn't care about her relationship with Nick and just wants to leave with her, Liv shouts at Matty that she doesn't trust him and throws everyone out. When Liv regrets having treated in that way, she runs to him. Matty is not disposed to forgive her, so she drinks a whole bottle of vodka to prove to him that she trusts him to look after her while she's sick. Matty ends up to carry her into his garage as she throws up. He takes care of her until the next morning, when Nick bursts in, thinking they are robbers. Matty begs Nick for his help in convincing their father to let him come home, and he and Liv part with an understanding between them.

In "Nick", Matty has been allowed to re-enter the family home, subject to a contract of rules. Nick, pretenting that their family finally works, lies to Matty when he asks Nick if his relationship with Liv is a problem. Nick insists that he was never into her, but Matty, guessing the opposite, suggests him they need to trust each other. At school, Matty is allowed to re-enroll in college on probation, thanks Nick who was winning Rugby games. Afterwards, Nick takes Matty to meet the gang. He recognizes Franky and they exchange a knowing look. Matty is relaxed and the group reacts to his jokes while Nick starts being jealous. When they meet for a drink, Nick's statements are followed by an awkward silence, although Matty helps out Nick playing up to Franky. To smooth tensions, Nick and Matty get Sambucas rolling. After overdoing it, Nick fights against Rider, who was around Mini. Matty tries to intervene but Nick ends up to beat Rider and break up with Mini. Later at the rugby pitch Matty offers to play with Nick, in trouble for the match of the day after. The game ends with Matty wrestling him to the ground. Nick's frustration boils over and he reveals the torment caused by Matty's re-emergence. At home, Nick smashes up the kitchen. Matty arrives and tells Nick to leave offering to take the blame. The morning after Nick gets home and discovers that Matty has packed a bag. He informs Leon he wrecked the house, which his father refuses to believe. Nick then confronts him for his tactless attitude, and Leon eventually relents. Outside, Matty and Nick gather Leon's motivational books and put them in a pile with Matty's contract. Their father watches from a window as Nick lights a match and sets the pile on fire.

In "Alo", Matty, Liv, Franky and Rich arrive at school to kidnap Alo, while his parents discuss him leaving college with Professor Blood on the day of his birthday. At the pub Matty Rich and Liv advise Alo to stand up to his parents but Alo admits that he can't wreck the farm because he does love them. However, after a terrible first day of work at the farm, Alo changes his mind and calls Matty. When the gang arrive they begin an egg and flour fight. Later, at Alo's party, Franky pushes a boy she's dancing with off of her and he retorts by shoving her into the wall, witnessed by Matty and Liv. When Alo's parents are back they all run away and carry on Alo's after-birthday-party at Levan house. Matty and Liv is having sex in the bathroom when Franky spots them behind the ajar door. Matty glimpses Franky, who rushes off, apparently scared by the sexual side of love.

In "Grace", the rehearsals for Twelfth Night, which Grace is directing, are under way. Matty plays the role of Orsino and Franky is Viola Cesario. While the pair is sharing a love scene, Liv gets suspicious and makes Matty quit the play with her. At the student Matty notices Franky being hassled by a guy at the bar and intervenes, causing Liv to argue with him. The day after, Grace makes Matty rejoin the play, where he says to feel a bad boyfriend even if he loves Liv. At rehearsals Matty and Franky have another scene together, when Matty leans in to kiss her Franky avoids him. During the assessed performance of the play, Matty can't avoid Franky's eyes. Liv goes backstage and asks him if he loves Franky. Matty can't answer and Liv, feeling hurt, tells him to forget her. Despite this very awkward scene, the play comes to an end and everyone lines up to bow.

In "Everyone", it's Rich and Grace's wedding day. Franky breaks into Matty's bedroom and leaves him a note that says she doesn't understand what's happening between them. Mini having a crush on Franky warns Matty to stay away from her and nods in agreement. The gang set off on the long journey to the church in Alo's van. However, the van crashes, causing Franky to fall on top of Matty. Matty hands Franky a note, saying that his feelings for her are something that he can't stop. Out of the van, Grace and Rich manage to get a lift leaving the others to walk the rest of the way. While they're going, Franky discovers that Mini talked to Matty on her back, and decides to carry on the journey only with Liv and Matty. After taking drugs, the trio ends up in a village hall, where they steal wine. When Franky starts dancing under a chandelier, and Matty plays the piano for her, Liv feels Franky up to see Matty's reaction, causing Liv to argue with him while Franky leaves. When Matty catches her up in the woods, Franky reveals to him how she feels different from anyone else. Then they start kissing and end up nearly having sex, but at foreplay Franky has a panic attack and runs off a cliff. She almost falls, but Mini, Liv and Matty find her and pull her to safety. Finally, they arrive at the church. After Rich and Grace's aborted wedding the gang round off the day at a local gig, where Matty and Liv decide to break up amicably and Franky and Matty share a hug.

Series 6
In "Everyone", Franky is now going through a rough patch with her relationship with Matty. They're spending together a long holiday in North Africa but while Matty wants to be with Franky, she just seems to be pulling away from him. When the gang reaches them in Morocco all of them join the party at a flash nearby villa owned by Luke. As Franky is dancing Matty approaches to talk, despite his apologies she tells him that their relationship is getting boring and walks off finding solace in Luke. The next day, Luke and his mate Jake pay the gang a visit. The weed they're smoking belongs to them and they need the rest back. Pretending to make up he invites the gang to a beach party, but once there, a group of peddlers concurring with Luke and Jake puts a shipment of drugs in Matty's car. While Jake threatens Matty that Luke will have his way with Franky if he doesn't smuggle six kilograms of weed into Marrakech, Luke persuade Franky to run away with him. Matty tries to fight Jake but ends up getting beaten up. At the car, Matty sees Luke and Franky drive away and Grace tries to console him. Liv, who's just learned that Luke is dangerous, gets rushing into the car and orders Matty to go after them. A car chase ensues which ends up with Matty's car falling off a cliff. Grace passes out severely injured while Liv wounded as well revives. Matty, bleeding, seeing the shipment of drugs and in shock at the sight of Grace apparently dead, runs away desperately. Three weeks later, a new year at school starts. The gang is divided, Grace is in a coma and Matty is still missing and wanted by the police. Nick misses his brother and wonders why he doesn't call. In the end, Matty does call Nick but Nick doesn't answer.

In "Alex", after Grace dies in her coma, and the group help Alex bury his dead grandmother at sea, Franky sends Matty a voicemail and tells him never to come back.

In "Franky", after several weeks, Matty makes contact with Franky. During the phone conversation she stays silent while Matty begs for answers confessing to be scared and unable to come back. Eventually she replies that she is still furious with him for running after the accident in which Grace died before she hangs up and goes back into Luke's arms. At night, Matty calls Franky again, saying he can't carry on without her. When he understands that she is with Luke he implores her to come away with him, but Franky answers that she doesn't care and he has to stay out. Luke then rips the phone from Franky's hand and throws it out of the car.

In "Nick", Matty talks over webcam with his brother. He managed to find a way to come home from Morocco but he needs his help to pay a guy who's disposed to send him passport and plane ticket. Nick agrees even though he's living an internal struggle: he does want Matty to come back but he's fallen in love with Franky and his friends have no desire to meet Matty, given his involvement in Grace's death. Things get worse when the gangster, a dodgy man known as The Doctor, asks him always for more money. When Matty calls his brother again, he realizes his friends are blaming him for Grace's death and Nick isn't helping. Fed up he relieves Nick of the burden of the mission. Nick tries again to cope with The Doctor but without success. Eventually, Nick and Franky decide to form a relationship. When Matty tries to contact Nick, it's Franky to answer, showing herself on purpose while she's wearing Nick's shirt in his bedroom. Matty astonished gets the message and Franky ends the call.

In "Liv", Matty has finally been smuggled in from Morocco and comes back to Bristol. When Liv returns home late at night, she is aghast to find Matty waiting for her. The morning after, Alex, back from his gay hot weekend, enters his room completely naked and finds Matty in the same condition sleeping on his bed. After an awkward introduction, Liv points out that Matty must leave Bristol, but he refuses to do it before talking to Franky. Liv reluctantly takes Matty at Mini's house to see Franky, who wastes no time in telling him that she's having sex with his brother and doesn't want to see him again. Mini is furious with Matty as well and takes it out on Liv. When Liv starts beating her, Matty drags her off but she pushes him away yelling at him he shouldn't have left her after the car crash. Bleeding and crying, Mini confesses to be pregnant with Alo's baby.

In "Mini and Franky", Matty is waiting for Franky outside Mini's house. The little smirk on Franky's face when she realises he's spying on her suggests that she's not yet done with him. When the girls go out, though they try to ignore him, an argument inevitably breaks out between Matty and Franky as he tries to win her back. Franky's lips spit venom but Matty isn't taken in by her, in fact she becomes so enraptured by him that she doesn't realise Mini has collapsed in a heap. While Franky gets into a panic Matty suggests to call an ambulance. At the hospital, Nick arrives and finds out that Matty is back in Bristol. Matty seems confident he'll get Franky back, causing a fight between the brothers. Eventually Matty orders Franky to come clean about how she really feels and Nick realizes that she still loves Matty. Later, Nick proves Franky's love for him asking her to call the police on Matty but she refuses.

In "Finale", Matty and Nick have noticed Franky's departure and both head to Birmingham to find her. For this purpose the brothers steal a car as they track her down using Nick's iPhone, Franky is determined to keep running away and the mission fails. There's still feud between the brothers but Matty is wanted and without home. In order to look after him Nick asks Rich if he can lodge him, although Matty isn't up to stay and Rich is reluctant to agree. While sharing a spliff, Matty apologises to Rich for Grace's death, which he accepts. At the pool party Nick and Matty catch Franky up. She finally comes to a decision - she loves them both but doesn't want either of them. Eventually Franky spurs Matty to do what he needs to fix his life. Embittered, Matty and Nick let her go and reach the boys in the last night of celebration, until the morning, when Mini starts having contractions and has to be rushed to hospital. At the end, Matty and Nick share a final hug before Matty turns himself in.

References

External links
Matty facebook
Matty twitter
Matty Soundcloud
Matty myspace
Matty IMDb

Fictional LGBT characters in television
Skins (British TV series) characters
Fictional English people
Television characters introduced in 2011
Fictional bisexual males
Male characters in television
Teenage characters in television
British male characters in television